The fourth season of the American competitive reality television series MasterChef Junior premiered on Fox on November 6, 2015 and concluded on January 29, 2016. Gordon Ramsay and Graham Elliot returned as judges. Christina Tosi replaced Joe Bastianich as the third judge.

The winner was Addison Osta Smith, a 9-year-old from River Forest, Illinois, with Avery Kyle from Baton Rouge, Louisiana being the runner-up.

Top 24 
Source for all first names, ages, and hometowns

Elimination table

 
  (WINNER) This cook won the competition.
  (RUNNER-UP) This cook finished in second place.
  (WIN) The cook won the individual challenge (Mystery Box or Elimination Test).
  (WIN) The cook was on the winning team in the Team Challenge and directly advanced to the next round.
  (HIGH) The cook was one of the top entries in an individual challenge, but did not win.
 (PT) The cook was on the losing team in the Team Challenge, competed in the Pressure Test, and advanced.
  (IN) The cook was not selected as a top or bottom entry in an individual challenge.
  (IN) The cook was not selected as a top or bottom entry in a Team Challenge.
  (IMM) The cook did not have to compete in that round of the competition and was safe from elimination.
  (IMM) The cook was selected by the Mystery Box Challenge winner and did not have to compete in the Elimination Test.
  (LOW) The cook was one of the bottom entries in an individual challenge, and advanced.
  (LOW) The cook was one of the bottom entries in a Team Challenge, and advanced.
  (ELIM) The cook was eliminated.

Episodes

References

2015 American television seasons
2016 American television seasons
Season 4